Margaret Carnegie Library is a historic Carnegie Library building completed in 1906 at Mills College in California. It was designed by Julia Morgan, the first woman architect to be licensed in California. It was the second of the many Morgan designed buildings on campus.

Made of reinforced concrete it includes uses Mission-style architecture details and has a red tile roof, iron balconies and arched windows. The interior has exposed wood beams. The library is named for Andrew Carnegie's daughter (his mother was also named Margaret).

See also
El Campanil bell tower

References

Julia Morgan buildings
Carnegie libraries in California
Library buildings completed in 1906
Mission Revival architecture in California
Mills College
1906 establishments in California